The Cornell Big Red women's hockey team represented Cornell University in the 2011–12 NCAA Division I women's ice hockey season. The Big Red are coached by Doug Derragh and aims to become the first team in ECAC to triumph in the NCAA Frozen Four championship game.

Offseason
August 5: Eight Big Red players were invited to the Canada Under-22 National Team Selection Camp from August 7–16. The players include: Amanda Mazzotta, Hayleigh Cudmore, Laura Fortino, Lauriane Rougeau, Jessica Campbell, Brianne Jenner, Chelsea Karpenko, Jillian Saulnier and Catherine White.
October 17: Head coach Doug Derragh announced that senior players Rebecca Johnston, Catherine White, Chelsea Karpenko and Amanda Young were all named team captains for the season.

Recruiting

Exhibition

Regular season
In her first three career NCAA games, Jillian Saulnier registered ten points (seven goals, three assists), along with a +6 rating. In her college debut versus the Colgate Raiders women's ice hockey program, Saulnier netted four goals. In her next game versus the Yale Bulldogs, she registered one goal and two assists, while scoring two goals in her third game versus the Brown Bears women's ice hockey squad. For the month of October 2011, she was tied for first in the ECAC in goals scored (while the other player appeared in eight games).
October 25: In a 6-2 triumph over the Colgate Raiders, freshman Jillian Saulnier scored four goals in her NCAA debut. It was the first four-goal game for Cornell since Jessica Campbell scored four against Robert Morris in the second game of the 2010-11 season. The Big Red held a 64-12 advantage in shots on goal while also winning faceoffs by a margin of 53-27. The 64 shots were the most the Big Red took since a Feb. 6, 2000 contest against Union.
October 29: In a 9-0 win versus ECAC opponent Brown, Big Red freshman Emily Fulton scored her first career NCAA goal. At game's end, Big Red skaters totalled 23 points, as Brianne Jenner and Hayleigh Cudmore led the way with three points each.
November 1: For the third consecutive contest, the Big Red scored at least nine goals in one game. Senior captain Chelsea Karpenko appeared in her 100th career game, as Jillian Saulnier led all Big Red players with two goals and three assists in a 9-2 triumph over the Syracuse Orange women's ice hockey program.
January 2012: The Big Red announced their NCAA commitments for autumn 2012. The players that have committed to join the Big Red include Jessica Brown (of the Pittsburgh Elite), Kelly Murray, Victoria Pittens, Cassandra Poudrier (from Dawson College), Morgan Richardson (older sister of the late Daron Richardson), and Anna Zorn.

Standings

Schedule

Regular season

ECAC Hockey Tournament

Quarterfinals

Semifinal

Final

Awards and honors
Emily Fulton, ECAC Rookie of the Week (Week of November 21, 2011)
Brianne Jenner, ECAC Player of the Week (Week of October 31, 2011)
Rebecca Johnston, Finalist, ECAC Player of the Year (2011–12)
Amanda Mazzotta, ECAC Goaltender of the Week (Week of November 28, 2011)
Amanda Mazzotta, ECAC Goaltender of the Week (Week of January 24, 2012)
Jillian Saulnier, ECAC Rookie of the Week (Week of October 31, 2011)
Jillian Saulnier, ECAC Rookie of the Week (Week of November 7, 2011)
Jillian Saulnier, ECAC Rookie of the Month (Month of October 2011)
 Lauren Slebodnik, ECAC Defensive Player of the Week (Week of January 17, 2012)
 Rebecca Johnston, 2011-12 Ivy League Player of the Year 
 Jillian Saulnier, 2011-12 Ivy League Rookie of the Year
 Rebecca Johnston, 2011-12 First Team All-Ivy
 Brianne Jenner, 2011-12 First Team All-Ivy
 Lauriane Rougeau, 2011-12 First Team All-Ivy
 Laura Fortino, 2011-12 First Team All-Ivy
 Amanda Mazzotta, 2011-12 Second Team All-Ivy
 Jillian Saulnier, 2011-12 Honorable Mention All-Ivy
 Catherine White, 2011-12 Honorable Mention All-Ivy
 Chelsea Karpenko, 2011-12 Honorable Mention All-Ivy
 Alyssa Gagliardi, 2011-12 Honorable Mention All-Ivy
 Rebecca Johnston, 2011-12 ECAC Hockey Player of the Year 
 Jillian Saulnier, 2011-12 ECAC Hockey Rookie of the Year
 Chelsea Karpenko, 2011-12 ECAC Hockey Best Defensive Forward
 Lauriane Rougeau, 2011-12 ECAC Hockey Best Defensive Defenseman
 Rebecca Johnston, 2011-12 All-ECAC Hockey First Team
 Brianne Jenner, 2011-12 All-ECAC Hockey First Team
 Lauriane Rougeau, 2011-12 All-ECAC Hockey First Team
 Laura Fortino, 2011-12 All-ECAC Hockey First Team
 Jillian Saulnier, 2011-12 All-ECAC Hockey Second Team
 Jillian Saulnier, 2011-12 All-ECAC Hockey Rookie Team

Team awards
Erin Barley-Maloney, Kate Hallada Pinhey '83 Most Improved Player Award
Alyssa Gagliardi (co-recipient), TGHA Cub Club Mentor Award
Alyssa Gagliardi (co-recipient), Wendell Earle Academic Awards
Xandra Hompe (co-recipient), Wendell Earle Academic Awards
Rebecca Johnston, Cornell women's hockey Bob Brunet '41 Most Valuable Player
Chelsea Karpenko (co-recipient), William Fuert Jr. '39 Big Red Player of the Year Award
Amanda Mazzotta (co-recipient), William Fuert Jr. '39 Big Red Player of the Year Award
Amanda Mazzotta (co-recipient), Wendell Earle Academic Awards
Kendice Ogilvie (co-recipient), Helanie Fisher Hebbie '84 Unsung Hero Award
Jillian Saulnier, Class of '41 Rookie of the Year Award
Catherine White (co-recipient), TGHA Cub Club Mentor Award
Amanda Young (co-recipient), Helanie Fisher Hebbie '84 Unsung Hero Award

CWHL Draft
The following were selected in the 2012 CWHL Draft.

References

Cornell Big Red women's ice hockey seasons
Cornell
NCAA women's ice hockey Frozen Four seasons
Cornell
Cornell